Mark Steven McLemore (born October 9, 1980) is a former Major League Baseball pitcher who played for the Houston Astros in 2007.

McLemore graduated from Del Oro High School, and attended Oregon State University. In 2001, he played collegiate summer baseball with the Bourne Braves of the Cape Cod Baseball League.

He was selected by the Astros in the 4th round of the 2002 Major League Baseball Draft. McLemore made his big league debut for Houston on May 24, pitching one inning of relief against the Arizona Diamondbacks.

In 2010, he was signed by Minnesota Twins to a minor league contract, then was later invited to Spring Training with the Chico Outlaws of the Golden Baseball League.  He last played for the Florida Marlins organization in 2011.

References

External links

1980 births
Houston Astros players
Major League Baseball pitchers
Living people
Oregon State Beavers baseball players
Bourne Braves players
Baseball players from Sacramento, California
Tri-City ValleyCats players
Martinsville Astros players
Lexington Legends players
Salem Avalanche players
Corpus Christi Hooks players
Round Rock Express players
Chico Outlaws players
New Orleans Zephyrs players
People from Loomis, California